Anna Podesnaya (born 13 August 1970 in Leningrad) is a Russian ballerina.

Education
In 1988 she graduated with suma cum laude from the Vaganova Choreographic School of Leningrad in the class of Lyudila Safronova and Agrippina Vaganova. She then joined the Saint-Petesburg State Academy Ballet Theatre, directed by Askold Makarov. In 2000 she joined the Konstantin Tachkin's St Petersburg Ballet Theatre, becoming a principal dancer in the 2003/04 season.

Career & Repertory
Odette/Odile (Swan Lake), Clara and Sugar Plum Fairy (The Nutcracker), Pas de deux and Giselle (Giselle), Princess Florina and Aurora (The Sleeping Beauty), Phrygia (Spartacus), Seventh and Eleventh Waltzes (Les Sylphides).

Currently she works as a ballet instructor at Vaganova Academy of Russian Ballet with such instructors as Alla Shelest, Alla Osipenko, Lyudmila Kunakova, Ninel Petrova, and Ludmila Safronova.

References

1970 births
Living people
Russian ballerinas
Dancers from Saint Petersburg
Vaganova graduates
21st-century Russian ballet dancers